Jaroslav Kolbas (born 10 January 1985) is a professional Slovak football defender who currently plays for the 3. Liga (East) club Mladosť Kalša.

Club career
In December 2009, Kolbas terminated the one-year loan at Skoda Xanthi after half season and came back to Košice. In July 2011, he joined Slovak club 1. FC Tatran Prešov, signing two-year contract.

International career
On 22 May 2008, Kolbas debuted for the Slovakia national football team in friendly match against Turkey at Bielefelder Alm.

Career statistics

Last updated: 14 March 2013

References

External links
 
 MFK Košice profile
 

1985 births
Living people
Sportspeople from Trebišov
Slovak footballers
Slovak expatriate footballers
Slovakia international footballers
Association football defenders
FC VSS Košice players
FC Steel Trans Ličartovce players
1. FC Tatran Prešov players
Xanthi F.C. players
FC Nitra players
FK Haniska players
Družstevník Veľký Horeš players
FK Slavoj Trebišov players
TJ Mladosť Kalša players
Slovak Super Liga players
2. Liga (Slovakia) players
3. Liga (Slovakia) players
Slovak expatriate sportspeople in Greece
Expatriate footballers in Greece